James Maxwell (23 March 1929 – 18 August 1995) was an American-British actor, theatre director and writer, particularly associated with the Royal Exchange Theatre in Manchester.

Early life
He was born in Worcester, Massachusetts, United States, but spent most of his career in the United Kingdom and died in London. He came to Britain at the age of 20 to train at the Old Vic theatre school. While there he met fellow students Casper Wrede and Richard Negri (co-founders of the Royal Exchange 25 years later).

Work in the theatre
After seasons at the Bristol Old Vic and the Piccolo Theatre in Manchester he started to collaborate with the directors Michael Elliott and Casper Wrede, initially with the 59 Theatre Company. He translated Georg Büchner's Danton's Death (original title: Dantons Tod) for the opening production at the Lyric Theatre, Hammersmith. Elliott and Wrede went on to run the Old Vic company and Maxwell joined them to act in several of the productions including The Merchant of Venice and Measure for Measure.

The group then joined with Braham Murray in Manchester to form the 69 Theatre Company. Maxwell adapted Daniel Deronda; directed by Elliott and starring Vanessa Redgrave it was subsequently televised. He acted in many productions for the company including Prospero in The Tempest in 1969 and Thomas More in A Man for All Seasons in 1975. He also directed Arms and the Man with Tom Courtenay, Jenny Agutter and Brian Cox in 1973.

Based upon the success of this collaboration the group started to look for a permanent theatre in Manchester and eventually a new theatre was built inside the disused Royal Exchange with Maxwell as one of the founding artistic directors. He appeared in both the opening productions: Kleist's The Prince of Homburg (original title: Der Prinz von Homburg) and Sheridan's The Rivals and remained an artistic director until his death in 1995. As well as acting in many productions over the course of 20 years, he adapted several novels including The Count of Monte Cristo, Pride and Prejudice and The Moonstone. He also directed over 20 productions. As Braham Murray recalled. "As an artist he was multi-talented and practised each of his skills with discretion. As a writer, he translated many works; as a director he was particularly skilful at comedy. He loved to make people laugh, but it was as an actor that he would want to be remembered."

Theatre Productions at the Royal Exchange
The productions directed by Maxwell during his time as artistic director include:

 Present Laughter by Noël Coward with Albert Finney (1977)
 The Skin of Our Teeth by Thornton Wilder. Directed by Richard Negri and James Maxwell with Olive McFarland and Lee Montague (1977)
 The Schoolmistress by Arthur Wing Pinero with Patricia Routledge (1979)
The Corn is Green by Emlyn Williams with Avril Elgar and Alan Parnaby (1981)
 Treasure Island adapted by James Maxwell with Clive Duncan and Ronald Forfar (1981)
 While the Sun Shines by Terence Ratigan with Paul Barber, Mick Ford and Caroline Goodall (1983)
 Hay Fever by Noël Coward with Richard McCabe, Dilys Hamlett and Marsha Hunt (1985)
 Zack by Harold Brighouse with Tim Healy and Bridget Turner (1986)
 Among Barbarians by Michael Wall. World premiere with Dominic Keating, Tariq Yunus and Avril Elgar (1989)
 She Stoops to Conquer by Oliver Goldsmith with Una Stubbs, Ewan Hooper, Andy Serkis and Lorraine Ashbourne (1990)
 Pride and Prejudice. World premiere adapted and directed by James Maxwell with Avril Elgar, Melanie Thaw, Rufus Sewell, Ben Daniels and Helen McCrory (1991)
 The Doctor's Dilemma by George Bernard Shaw with Jeremy Clyde, Trevor Baxter and Clive Owen (1991)
 Blithe Spirit by Noël Coward with Miranda Foster and Susie Blake (1991)
 Sidewalk Sidney by Rhandi McWilliams. World premiere with Eddie Osei and Charlie Caine (1992)
 An Ideal Husband by Oscar Wilde with Brenda Blethyn, Robert Glenister, Una Stubbs and Tom Chadbon (1992)
 The Moonstone. Adapted and directed by James Maxwell with Struan Rodger (1993)
 The Importance of Being Earnest by Oscar Wilde with Sam West, Neil Dudgeon and Avril Elgar (1994)
 The Count of Monte Cristo adapted by James Maxwell and Jonathon Hackett. World premiere directed by Braham Murray with David Threlfall and Colin Prockter (1994)
 Absurd Person Singular by Alan Ayckbourn with Trevor Cooper, Margo Gunn, Denys Hawthorne, Patrick O'Kane and Amanda Boxer (1994)

Work in television and film
Although the theatre was always his first love he appeared in television and film. His best-known television role was as King Henry VII in a BBC2 drama series, The Shadow of the Tower, but it did not have the same level of success as The Six Wives of Henry VIII (1970), which was its predecessor drama. His other television credits include a prominent role in the Doctor Who story Underworld (1978). He also appeared as Osmond in a television serial of Henry James' The Portrait of a Lady (1968), Frontier (1968), The Avengers, Doomwatch: The Iron Doctor (1971),Thriller and The Saint. He played General-Major von Wittke in an episode of Enemy at the Door titled "Treason" (ep. 10, season 1, aired March 25, 1978).

He was also seen in the films Private Potter (1962), The Evil of Frankenstein (1964), Otley (1968) and One Day in the Life of Ivan Denisovich (1970). The first and last of these directed by his friend and colleague Casper Wrede.

Personal life
He married the actress Avril Elgar in 1952 and the couple had two sons. They met at the Old Vic theatre school and she appeared in many of Maxwell's productions. He died in 1995.

James Maxwell was referenced in the Royal Exchange Theatre, Manchester episode of Most Haunted (S8,07) when psychic medium David Wells allegedly received a message from Maxwell's spirit. His career was touched upon as a founding member of the theatre.

Selected filmography
 Subway in the Sky (1959) – Officer
 Girl on Approval (1961) – John Howland
 Design for Loving (1962) – Joe
 The Traitors (1962) – Ray Ellis
 The Damned (1962) – Mr. Talbot
 Private Potter (1962) – Lt. Colonel Harry Gunyon
 The Third Secret (1964) – Mark
 The Evil of Frankenstein (1964) – Priest
 Far from the Madding Crowd (1967) – Doctor (uncredited)
 Otley (1969) – Rollo
 Connecting Rooms (1970) – Principal of Art College
 One Day in the Life of Ivan Denisovich (1970) – Captain
 Ransom (1974) – Bernhard
 Four Friends (1981) – Hippie

References

External links
 
 
 
 
 

1929 births
1995 deaths
Male actors from Worcester, Massachusetts
American male film actors
American male television actors
American expatriates in the United Kingdom
American theatre directors
Artistic directors
20th-century American male actors